Khundrakpam is one of the 60 Vidhan Sabha constituencies in the Indian state of Manipur.

Members of Legislative Assembly 

*by poll

Election results

2017 result

2012 result

See also
 List of constituencies of the Manipur Legislative Assembly
 Imphal East district

References

External link
 

Imphal East district
Assembly constituencies of Manipur